"Walking Big & Tall" is the thirteenth episode of the twenty-sixth season of the American animated television series The Simpsons, and the 565th overall episode of the series. It originally aired on the Fox network in the United States on February 8, 2015.

Plot
At a town hall meeting, the town discovers that its anthem "Only Springfield" is being used by numerous towns in North America such as Tuscaloosa, Austin, Oakland, Calgary, and Provo, after former mayor Hans Moleman bought the anthem from a salesman. Lisa and Bart compose a new anthem called "Why Springfield, Why Not" and perform it in the theater with other students. Homer has difficulty sitting in his seat at the performance due to his obesity, and when he must stand to give a standing ovation, he inadvertently tears out his row of seats, causing destruction to the theater. Marge urges him to join a weight-control group, but the one he joins run by the mobility scooter-bound Albert states that obesity is beautiful, and Homer decides to embrace his obesity.

After the group causes a disruption outside a fashion store which they claim promotes unrealistically thin figures, Marge urges Homer to leave the group and start a diet, but he refuses. Confronting Homer and the obese group at a rally, Marge finally points out that Homer should not follow Albert, who she says is too lazy to walk. Albert attempts to get up from his scooter to prove her wrong, but suffers a fatal heart attack. At Albert's funeral, Homer delivers a eulogy where upon learning that the deceased was only 23, he pleads for the obese people to lose weight. He and Marge walk home as he promises to yo-yo diet, and a montage shows Homer's physique changing drastically with his age over the next few decades.

Reception
The episode received an audience of 2.78 million, making it the second most watched show on Fox that night.

Dennis Perkins of The A.V. Club gave the episode a B−, saying "The careless construction of latter-day Simpsons episodes is never more pronounced than in ‘Walking Big & Tall,’ a slapdash amalgam of two marginally promising plots which would have benefitted from some room to breathe. Even more than the usual resulting thinness of main and sub-plot, ‘Walking Big & Tall’ sets up one A-story and simply abandons it in favor of another, the baffling result of which is a confused two-headed monster of an episode whose flashes of amusement wither under the latter plot’s mean-spirited succession of fat jokes".

Michael Price was nominated for a Writers Guild of America Award for Outstanding Writing in Animation at the 68th Writers Guild of America Awards for his script to this episode.

References

External links 
 
 "Walking Big & Tell" at theSimpsons.com

2015 American television episodes
The Simpsons (season 26) episodes
Television episodes about obesity
Television episodes about funerals